The Stara Zagora Transmitter was a high power mediumwave broadcasting station near Stara Zagora in Bulgaria.

It had at least 3 guyed masts. One of these masts was a Blaw-Knox Tower. It was one of the few Blaw-Knox towers in Europe, along with similar masts at Vakarel, Bulgaria, at Riga, Latvia, Lakihegy, Hungary and Lisnagarvey, Northern Ireland.

The transmitter was shut down on April 7, 2013. The masts were dismantled and scrapped in November 2014.

See also 
 List of tallest structures in Bulgaria

External links 
 Pictures and description in Bulgarian

Towers in Bulgaria
Buildings and structures in Stara Zagora